William R. Meagher (1903–1981) was a senior partner with the New York law firm Skadden, Arps, Slate, Meagher & Flom,
one of the largest and highest-grossing law firms in the world. Meagher, a trial and appellate lawyer, served as senior partner from 1968 to 1974, and continued working with the firm until his death in 1981. Meagher was graduate of Fordham University.

References

External links 

1903 births
1981 deaths
Fordham University alumni
Skadden, Arps, Slate, Meagher & Flom people